Engadine High School (abbreviated as EHS) is a school located in Engadine, Sydney, New South Wales, Australia, on Porter Road. It is a co-educational high school operated by the New South Wales Department of Education with students from years 7 to 12. The school was established in 1969 as a result of the growing population in the Engadine area.

History
Established in 1969, Engadine High School has been awarded the Director-General's Award for achievement for: Excellence in Performing Arts (2002), Consolidating a strong learning culture (2004) and Outstanding Linkages Program with Primary Schools (2006). In 2009 a celebration of the school's fortieth anniversary was held in the school grounds for students and locals.

The school's original motto was "To find and not to yield", taken from the Tennyson poem "Ulysses".  This was later changed to "Dream, Believe, Succeed".

Facilities
The school consists of four primary classroom blocks with additional buildings hosting the Library, Hall and Canteen. Several portable buildings are located around the school hosting additional classrooms and facilities such as the Band Room. The four primary blocks undergo constant improvements on a classroom basis which has in recent years included the installation of new science laboratories, new music rooms and the installation of projectors and screens in every classroom.

Specialist class rooms include; two sewing rooms, four wood/metal work rooms, two kitchens (including one with an ‘industrial kitchen’ for HSC and VET subjects), five computer labs, several music rooms including a specialist computer lab, a band room, one dance/drama rooms and five modern science laboratories.

From the commencement of the 2012 school year the school had full disabled access for students in wheelchairs in both the mainstream school and in the support unit. This has been achieved through the installation of ramps and a lift around the campus.

Additional recent construction work has seen a garage built for the new school bus, the first in its history, along the rear of C Block. In 2012 as a result of constant issues the Astroturf that was briefly on the basketball courts, funded by an external grant, was pulled up and was replaced with rubber mulch. The main quad has also been extended to include a larger covered seating area alongside the old Year 11 and 12 Bays with the seats being provided by senior metalwork classes.

Activities 

Engadine High School has had success in extracurricular activities.

In 2000, Engadine High School won the Rock Eisteddfod Challenge with their performance The Time Machine. Taking the audience on an adventure to space, the aztecs, a visit from aliens.

In 2001, the school was named equal first, in The Australian newspaper in the category of Highest level in the performing arts over a sustained period of time, Australia wide.
The school was placed 5th in The 2006 Rock Eisteddfod Challenge (Sydney Open Division) with their production of Be Yourself.  The schools Junior and Senior Dance Ensembles represented the school and the Sydney Region Dance Festival, 2006 Schools Spectacular and local charity performances.

In recent years, the school has become successful at the ‘F1 Challenge’ with each year group sending through at least one team to regional competitions and beyond as part of their Year 8 TAS classes. The 2011 team has succeeded in the state competition and will be heading to the nationals in early 2012. Resources including the car production machine are pooled between Engadine and Menai High Schools with fierce competition at regional and state level between teams from the two schools.

The School's bands (Premier and Concert) are a highly popular activity and involve many students from across the school, in addition Year 6 primary school students join the band to begin practicing before moving up to Engadine so they can slot right in straight away. During 2011 the band made a visit to California where they performed at several locations including Santa Monica Pier, Universal Studios, Disney and, as a first ever performance at the location, outside Madame Tussauds on Hollywood Boulevard.

In June 2012, the school hosted its second musical, a rendition of ‘13’, incorporating band, drama and design and technology students. It is anticipated that a musical will become a regular school feature in coming years.

Notable Alumni
- Chad Townsend 

- Michael Lichaa

Controversies 
In December 2013, it was alleged by a parent of a student with Down syndrome that her daughter and other students of the support unit were not invited to the Year 10 formal. However, the school responded by claiming that the formal was not organised by the school itself, but rather by Year 10 students and their parents, and that the students in the support unit had been invited to the formal. Other parents defended the school, saying notes given to the support unit students did not always make it home.

In early 2018, Engadine High School Principal Kerrie Jones has come under fire from parents and students for her comments on sexual violence and female skirt lengths.

See also 

 List of government schools in New South Wales
 Education in Australia

References 

Sutherland Shire
Public high schools in Sydney
Rock Eisteddfod Challenge participants
Educational institutions established in 1969
1969 establishments in Australia